Pierre Allard (born August 19, 1972) is a former professional ice hockey player.

Allard represented France in the 1998 Winter Olympics.

References

External links

1972 births
Living people
Brûleurs de Loups players
Canadian ice hockey right wingers
Chicoutimi Saguenéens (QMJHL) players
Ducs d'Angers players
Ice hockey players at the 1998 Winter Olympics
Manchester Storm (1995–2002) players
Montreal Canadiens coaches
Olympic ice hockey players of France
Rouen HE 76 players
Saint-Hyacinthe Laser players
Shawinigan Cataractes players
Ice hockey people from Montreal
Canadian expatriate ice hockey players in England
Canadian expatriate ice hockey players in France
Canadian ice hockey coaches